My Name's McGooley, What's Yours? is a popular Australian situation comedy series produced by ATN7 from 1966 to 1968.

Premise
The situation involved a young couple, Wally and Rita Stiller (John Meillon and Judi Farr), living in Balmain with Rita's father Dominic McGooley (Gordon Chater). Also in the regular cast were Stewart Ginn,   Robert McDarra, and later Noeline Brown joined as Wally’s sister.

The comedy of the series came from the clash of two generations living under one roof, a situation possibly inspired by the success of the 1960s British comedies Steptoe and Son and Till Death Us Do Part. Although only in his forties when cast, Chater played a curmudgeonly senior citizen who enjoyed irritating his son-in-law and fishing with his mates in prohibited areas of Sydney Harbour.

Production

Most episodes were written by creator-producer Ralph Peterson and directed by Ron Way. Location and filmed insert sequences were supplied by Artransa Park Studios. The flute and accordion duet composed for the theme tune was by Tommy Tycho.

Spin-offs

When Chater left the show in 1968 the remaining cast was spun off into a new series titled Rita and Wally but it was found that the character of Dominic was integral to the comedy of the situation and the series ended a few months later.

The series had a three-season run of 88 episodes under the McGooley title. In the final episode the old McGooley house is demolished as the Stillers must move out. Rita and Wally ran for a single season of 23 episodes.

Filming

The program was made on videotape but, as was common at the time, the videotape masters were wiped and re-used. 16mm film copies of the complete series, created for affiliates that couldn't broadcast it alongside the rest of the network, as well as for sale to foreign countries, were donated to the National Film and Sound Archive.

Cast
 Gordon Chater as Dominic McGooley
 John Meillon as Wally Stiller
 Judi Farr as Rita Stiller
 Noeline Brown as Rosemary "Possum" Urkens
 Stewart Ginn as Peregrine Nancarrow
Robert McDarra as Dong Rogers
 Frank Taylor as Vile

Legacy 
The program was rated number 24 in 2005 television special 50 Years 50 Shows which counted-down Australia's greatest television programs.

See also 
 List of Australian television series

Notes

References 
 Moran, Albert. Moran's Guide to Australian TV Series, Allen & Unwin, 1993.

External links 
 
 My Name's McGooley, What's Yours? - Classic Australian Television
 

1960s Australian comedy television series
1967 Australian television series debuts
1968 Australian television series endings
Australian television sitcoms
Seven Network original programming
Television shows set in Sydney
Black-and-white Australian television shows